Hutten's Grave is an 1823 oil on canvas painting by Caspar David Friedrich, showing a man in Lützow Free Corps uniform standing by the grave of the Renaissance poet and humanist Ulrich von Hutten. It is now in the Klassik Stiftung Weimar's collection and on show in the Schlossmuseum at the Stadtschloss Weimar.

References

Paintings by Caspar David Friedrich
Paintings in Thuringia
1823 paintings